Rudrapur City railway station is a small railway station in Udham Singh Nagar district, Uttarakhand. Its code is RUPC. It serves Rudrapur city. The station consists of two platforms. The platforms are not well sheltered. It lacks many facilities including water and sanitation.

Major trains

 Bagh Express
 Naini Doon Jan Shatabdi Express
 Kathgodam Express
 Uttarakhand Sampark Kranti Express
 Ranikhet Express
 Kathgodam–Moradabad Passenger
 Kathgodam–Jammu Tawi Garib Rath Express
 New Delhi–Kathgodam Shatabdi Express

References

Railway stations in Udham Singh Nagar district
Izzatnagar railway division
Rudrapur, Uttarakhand